Jonathan O'Callaghan (born January 1978) is an Irish former hurler who played for club team Castletownroche, divisional side Avondhu and at inter-county level with the Cork senior hurling team. He usually lined out as a forward.

Career

O'Callaghan first came to hurling prominence at juvenile and underage levels with Castletownroche. He progressed onto the club's top adult team and bookended his career with Cork JBHC title success in 1998 and 2019. He also earned selection with the Avondhu divisional side. O'Callaghan first enjoyed success on the inter-county scene as a member of the Cork intermediate hurling team and won All-Ireland Intermediate Championships in 2001 and 2003. He immediately joined the Cork senior hurling team and was an unused substitute when the team won consecutive All-Ireland Championship titles in 2004 and 2005. O'Callaghan was released from the Cork panel in February 2006.

Career statistics

Honours

Castletownroche
Cork Junior B Hurling Championship: 1998, 2019

Cork
All-Ireland Senior Hurling Championship: 2004, 2005
Munster Senior Hurling Championship: 2005
All-Ireland Intermediate Hurling Championship: 2001, 2003
Munster Intermediate Hurling Championship: 1999, 2001, 2003

References

1978 births
Living people
Avondhu hurlers
Castletownroche hurlers
Cork inter-county hurlers
Irish postmen